Agafya is a Russian female given name. Its colloquial forms are Agafiya, Agafia, and Ogafya. Notable people include:

 Agafya Grushetskaya (born 1663), Tsaritsa of Russia
 Agafya Kuzmenko (born 1897), Ukrainian teacher
 Agafia Lykova (born 1944), Russian Old Believer
 Agafia of Rus (born between 1190 and 1195), Princess of Mazovia

See also 
Agatha
Agafiya
Ogafya

Feminine given names
Russian feminine given names